KPBJ (90.1 FM) was a radio station formerly licensed to Midland, Texas, U.S., serving the Odessa-Midland metropolitan area. The station was owned by Paulino Bernal Evangelism formed by Paulino Bernal.

On June 30, 2011, the Federal Communications Commission canceled the station's license and deleted the call sign from its database.

References

External links

Defunct religious radio stations in the United States
PBJ
Radio stations disestablished in 2011
Defunct radio stations in the United States
2011 disestablishments in Texas
PBJ